This Is the Life is the second studio album by South African singer and vocalist Lulu Dikana. The album is the follow-up of My Diary, My Thoughts, her debut studio album.

Reception
The album was positively received among local music critics with Channel O describing the album as "a long spiritual conversation about LOVE and one that celebrates the gift of life". The album was nominated in three categories at the 12th Metro FM Music Awards and "Best R&B/Soul/Reggae Album" category at the 19th South African Music Awards.

Track listing
 "Introduction"
 "He Loves Me" produced by Wilson Joel
 "Saviour" produced by Wilson Joel
 "Keep Moving" produced by Wilson Joel
 "Number 1" produced by Wilson Joel
 "No Other Life" produced by Wilson Joel
 "This is the Life" produced by Wilson Joel
 "Voice of Love" produced by Wilson Joel
 "Walking Miracle" produced by Wilson Joel
 "The Season" produced by Wilson Joel
 "Love it was You" produced by Wilson Joel
 "You’ve been Good" produced by Wilson Joel featuring ikiri Lawrence
 "Bring the Children"

Release history

Accolades

References

2011 albums
Lulu Dikana albums